Anisotremus davidsonii, also known as the Xantic sargo or simply the sargo, is a species of grunt native to the eastern Pacific Ocean. They are found from Santa Cruz, California to Baja California, Mexico, with an isolated population located in the Gulf of California.

References 

Fish described in 1876